KFCB-LP (105.1 FM) is a radio station licensed to Douglas, Wyoming, United States. The station is an affiliate of Fundamental Broadcasting Network and is owned by Douglas Baptist Church.

References

External links
 

FCB-LP
Radio stations established in 2002
2002 establishments in Wyoming
FCB-LP